Hideaki Kobayashi may refer to:

 Hideaki Kobayashi (composer) (born 1973), game music composer for Sega
 Hideaki Kobayashi (diplomat) (born 1945), Japanese diplomat